The Old Man Who Cried Wolf is a 1970 American made-for-television thriller film directed by Walter Grauman and starring Edward G. Robinson, Martin Balsam and Diane Baker. It originally aired as the ABC Movie of the Week on October 13, 1970.

Plot
Robinson portrays an elderly man who witnesses the murder of a friend.

Cast
Edward G. Robinson as Emile Pulska
Martin Balsam as Stanley Pulska
Diane Baker as Peggy Pulska
Ruth Roman as Lois
Percy Rodrigues as Frank Jones
Sam Jaffe as Abe Stillman
Edward Asner as Dr. Morheim
Martin E. Brooks as Hudson F. Ewing
Jay C. Flippen as Pawnbroker

Production
Robinson described it as "a most rewarding experience, one which I thoroughly enjoyed".  Writer Luther Davis adapted the movie from a story by Arnold Horwitt.

Reception
The film was very well received by critics. Robinson's performance was critically acclaimed and was suggested for awards.   It was the seventh most-watched primetime program in the United States for the week upon its debut.<ref name="ratings">(29 October 1970). Welby still No. 1, Arizona Republic, p.20</ref>

The Hollywood Reporter called Robinson's performance "strong and moving".

The Los Angeles Times'' said Robinson's performance was "filled with skill and nuance" but the film "broke your heart by being a cop out of what it might have been."

References

External links

1970 television films
1970 films
1970s thriller films
ABC Movie of the Week
Films produced by Aaron Spelling
Films directed by Walter Grauman
American thriller television films
1970s American films